Suphachai Phosu (born 1 January 1958; nickname: Kaew) is a Thai politician from the Bhumjaithai Party. He is currently serving as Second Deputy Speaker of the House of Representatives.

References 

Living people
1958 births
Suphachai Phosu
Suphachai Phosu
Suphachai Phosu